SS William Tilghman was a Liberty ship built in the United States during World War II. She was named after William Tilghman, the Chief United States circuit judge of the United States Circuit Court for the Third Circuit and Chief Justice of the Supreme Court of Pennsylvania.

Construction
William Tilghman was laid down on 20 June 1942, under a Maritime Commission (MARCOM) contract, MCE hull 59, by the Bethlehem-Fairfield Shipyard, Baltimore, Maryland; she was sponsored by Mrs. F.G. Emerson, the wife of the general manager for Weyerhaeuser Timber Co., in Baltimore, and was launched on 7 August 1942.

History
William Tilghman was allocated to A.H. Bull & Co., Inc., on 18 August 1942. On 26 May 1950, she was laid up in the National Defense Reserve Fleet, Beaumont, Texas. On 6 June 1952, she was laid up in the National Defense Reserve Fleet, Olympia, Washington. On 15 April 1954, William Tilghman was withdrawn from the fleet to be loaded with grain under the "Grain Program 1954", she returned loaded on 5 May 1954. On 7 November 1956, she was withdrawn to be unload, she returned on empty 14 November 1956. She was sold for scrapping on 10 July 1970, to Zidell Explorations, Inc., along with two other ships, for $132,911.08. William Tilghman was withdrawn from the fleet on 3 August 1970.

References

Bibliography

 
 
 
 

 

Liberty ships
Ships built in Baltimore
1942 ships
Beaumont Reserve Fleet
Olympia Reserve Fleet
Olympia Reserve Fleet Grain Program